Glaucomastix is a genus of lizards that belongs to the family Teiidae.

Classification
Listed alphabetically.
Glaucomastix abaetensis  (Reis Dias, Rocha, & Vrcibradic, 2002) – Bahian sand dune lizard
Glaucomastix cyanura (Arias, De Carvalho, Rodrigues, & Zaher, 2011)
Glaucomastix itabaianensis Rosario, Santos, Arias, Rocha, Dias, Carvalho, & Rodrigues, 2019
Glaucomastix littoralis (Rocha, Bamberg Araújo, Vrcibradic, & Mamede da Costa, 2000)
Glaucomastix venetacauda (Arias, De Carvalho, Rodrigues, & Zaher, 2011)

References

 
Lizard genera
Taxa named by Noemí Goicoechea
Taxa named by Darrel Frost
Taxa named by Ignacio J. De la Riva
Taxa named by Kátia Cristina Machado Pellegrino
Taxa named by Jack W. Sites Jr.
Taxa named by Miguel Trefaut Rodrigues
Taxa named by José Manuel Padial